Usingeriessa nigrifusalis is a moth in the family Crambidae. It was described by Paul Dognin in 1911. It is found in Colombia.

References

Acentropinae
Moths described in 1911